Jimmy Lewis (April 11, 1918 – March 2, 2000) was an American double bassist who worked with the Count Basie Orchestra and sextet in the 1950s and with Duke Ellington, Cootie Williams, Billie Holiday and Ivory Joe Hunter before moving to bass guitar during his time with King Curtis. He provided the basslines for the musical Hair. Lewis freelanced extensively and performed on many albums by soul and jazz musicians, including Horace Silver and the Modern Jazz Quartet up until the late 1980s.  He died in 2000.

Discography
With Count Basie
The Count! (Clef, 1952 [1955])
Basie Jazz (Clef, 1952 [1954])
Dance Session Album #2 (Clef , 1954)
Blues by Basie (Columbia, 1956)
With Solomon Burke
 If You Need Me (Atlantic, 1963)
 King Solomon (Atlantic, 1968)
 I Wish I Knew (Atlantic, 1968)
With Billy Butler
Yesterday, Today & Tomorrow (Prestige, 1970)
With Al Casey
Buck Jumpin' (Swingville, 1960)
The Al Casey Quartet (Moodsville, 1960)
With David Clayton-Thomas
David Clayton-Thomas (Columbia, 1972) 
With King Curtis
Have Tenor Sax Will Blow (Atco, 1959)
Trouble In Mind (Tru-Sound, 1962) 
 It's Party Time With King Curtis (Tru-Sound, 1962)
The Great King Curtis (Clarion, 1964)
With Lou Donaldson
Everything I Play Is Funky (Blue Note, 1970) 
Pretty Things (Blue Note, 1970)
With Byrdie Green
The Golden Thursh Strikes at Midnight (Prestige, 1966)
I Got It Bad (And That Ain't Good) (Prestige, 1967)
Sister Byrdie! (Prestige, 1968)
With Grant Green
Carryin' On (Blue Note, 1969)
Green Is Beautiful (Blue Note, 1970)
With Tiny Grimes
Profoundly Blue (Muse, 1973)
With John P. Hammond
Big City Blues (Vanguard, 1964)
So Many Roads (Vanguard, 1965)
Mirrors (Vanguard, 1967)
I Can Tell (Atlantic, 1967)
With Richard "Groove" Holmes
Super Soul (Prestige, 1967)
Soul Power! (Prestige, 1967) 
With Alberta Hunter
Look for the Silver Lining (Columbia, 1983)
With Willis Jackson
Together Again, Again (Prestige, 1961 [1966]) - with Brother Jack McDuff
Star Bag (Prestige, 1968)
In the Alley (Muse, 1976) 
Single Action (Muse, 1978) - with Pat Martino
With Boogaloo Joe Jones
Right On Brother (Prestige, 1970)
No Way! (Prestige, 1970)
What It Is (Prestige, 1971)
Snake Rhythm Rock (Prestige, 1972)
With Charles Kynard
The Soul Brotherhood (Prestige, 1969)
Afro-Disiac (Prestige, 1970)
Wa-Tu-Wa-Zui (Beautiful People) (Prestige, 1970)
With Johnny Lytle
Good Vibes (Muse, 1982) 
With Freddie McCoy
Listen Here (Prestige, 1968)
With Galt MacDermot
Shapes of Rhythm (Kilamanjaro, 1966)
Hair (Original Off-Broadway Cast Recording) (RCA, 1967)
Hair (Original Broadway Cast Recording) (RCA, 1968)
Galt MacDermot's First Natural Hair Band (United Artists, 1970)
Up from the Basement (Kilmarnock, 1967-73 [2003])
With The Modern Jazz Quartet
Jazz Dialogue (Atlantic, 1965)
With Idris Muhammad
Black Rhythm Revolution! (Prestige, 1970)
Peace and Rhythm (Prestige, 1971)
With Mark Murphy
Living Room (Muse, 1984)
With Houston Person
Person to Person! (Prestige, 1970)
With Sonny Phillips
Black on Black! (Prestige, 1970)
With Wilson Pickett
In the Midnight Hour (Atlantic, 1965)
With Dave Pike
Jazz for the Jet Set (Atlantic, 1966)
With Arthur Prysock
This Guy's In Love With You (Milestone, 1987)
With Horace Silver
That Healin' Feelin'  (Blue Note, 1970)
With Johnny "Hammond" Smith
Gettin' Up (Prestige, 1967)
Soul Flowers (Prestige, 1967)
Dirty Grape (Prestige, 1968)
Black Feeling! (Prestige, 1969)
Here It 'Tis (Prestige, 1970)
What's Going On (Prestige, 1971)
With Buddy Terry
Natural Soul (Prestige, 1968)
With Charles Williams
Trees and Grass and Things (Mainstream, 1971)

References 

1918 births
2000 deaths
20th-century American musicians
20th-century American male musicians